The Second Stage of the 2011 Copa Santander Libertadores de América ran from February 9 to April 20, 2011 (match days: February 9, 15–17, 22–24, March 1–3, 8–10, 15–17, 22–24, 30–31, April 5–7, 12–14, 19–20).

Format
Twenty-six teams qualified directly into this round, to be joined by the six winners of the first stage. The thirty-two teams were drawn into eight groups of four on November 25, 2010, in Asunción.

The teams in each group played each other in a double round-robin format, playing the other teams in the group once at home and once away. Each team earned 3 points for a win, 1 point for a draw, and 0 points for a loss. The following criteria were used for breaking ties on points:
 Goal difference
 Goals scored
 Away goals
 Drawing of lots
The top two teams from each group advanced to the round of 16.

Groups

Group 1

Group 2

Group 3

Group 4

Group 5

Group 6

Group 7

Group 8

References

External links
 Official webpage  

Second Stage